The Quartigiani were a noble family from Lucca, the family was mentioned in the Lucca statute of 1308 as noble and powerful.  The family was united by means of marriage with the Simonetti and Antelminelli families.  The Antelminelli and Quartigiani families united in 1317 in order to take power in Lucca.  Castruccio Castracani, a member of the Antelminelli, did not share power with the Quartigiani as promised and agreed by the parties.  The Quartigiani organized a plot to take power from Castruccio Castracani and assassinate him.  The White Guelfs, the Florentines and the nobility from Lucca were involved in the plot.  After finding out about the plot Castracani arrested and killed members of the Quartigiani and related clans and organized a military response against Florence.

Members
Filippo Diversi

References

Further reading 
Louis Green, Castruccio Castracani: A study on the Origins and Character of a Fourteenth-Century Italian Despotism (Oxford, 1986)
Alberto Malvoti, Quelli della Volta (Comune di Fucecchio)

Surnames
Families of Lucca
Quartigiani